Ezikial Perry House is a historic home located at Jerusalem in Yates County, New York, USA. It is a two-story, Italianate style frame dwelling built about 1870.  It sits on a stone foundation and has a low-pitched hipped roof with dormers and cupola.  Also on the property are two wood-frame sheds dated to about 1870.

It was listed on the National Register of Historic Places in 1994.

References

Houses on the National Register of Historic Places in New York (state)
Italianate architecture in New York (state)
Houses completed in 1870
Houses in Yates County, New York
National Register of Historic Places in Yates County, New York